Gemina is a genus of green alga.

Species 

Some species include:
Gemina clavata
Gemina enteromorphoidea
Gemina letterstedtoidea
Gemina ulvoidea

References 

Ulvaceae
Ulvophyceae genera